Stumptown is a name or nickname that has been applied to several places in the United States. 

Stumptown may also refer to: 

 Stumptown (comics), an American comic book series by Greg Rucka and Matthew Southworth
 Stumptown (TV series), an American television series based on the comic book series
 Stumptown Coffee Roasters, an American coffee roaster and retailer based in Portland, Oregon
 "Stumptown", a song on Nickel Creek's album Why Should the Fire Die?